Copulabyssia colombia is a species of sea snail, a marine gastropod mollusk in the family Pseudococculinidae.

Distribution
C. colombia is found on the Colombian coast of the Caribbean sea.

Description 
The maximum recorded shell length is 3.6 mm.

Habitat 
Minimum recorded depth is 300 m. Maximum recorded depth is 300 m.

References

Pseudococculinidae
Gastropods described in 2005